This is a list of bestselling novels in the United States in the 1910s, as determined by The Bookman, a New York–based literary journal (1910–1912) and Publishers Weekly (1913 and beyond). The list features the most popular novels of each year from 1910 through 1919.

The standards set for inclusion in the lists – which, for example, led to the exclusion of the novels in the Harry Potter series from the lists for the 1990s and 2000s – are currently unknown.

1910
 The Rosary by Florence L. Barclay
 A Modern Chronicle by Winston Churchill
 The Wild Olive by Anonymous (Basil King)
 Max by Katherine Cecil Thurston
 The Kingdom of Slender Swords by Hallie Erminie Rives
 Simon the Jester by William J. Locke
 Lord Loveland Discovers America by C. N. Williamson and A. M. Williamson
 The Window at the White Cat by Mary Roberts Rinehart
 Molly Make-Believe by Eleanor Hallowell Abbott
 When a Man Marries by Mary Roberts Rinehart

1911
 The Broad Highway by Jeffery Farnol
 The Prodigal Judge by Vaughan Kester
 The Winning of Barbara Worth by Harold Bell Wright
 Queed by Henry Sydnor Harrison
 The Harvester by Gene Stratton Porter
 The Iron Woman by Margaret Deland
 The Long Roll by Mary Johnston
 Molly Make-Believe by Eleanor Hallowell Abbott
 The Rosary by Florence L. Barclay
 The Common Law by Robert W. Chambers

1912
 The Harvester by Gene Stratton Porter
 The Street Called Straight by Basil King
 Their Yesterdays by Harold Bell Wright
 The Melting of Molly by Maria Thompson Daviess
 A Hoosier Chronicle by Meredith Nicholson
 The Winning of Barbara Worth by Harold Bell Wright
 The Just and the Unjust by Vaughan Kester
 The Net by Rex Beach
 Tante by Anne Douglas Sedgwick
 Fran by J. Breckenridge Ellis

1913
 The Inside of the Cup by Winston Churchill
 V.V.'s Eyes by Henry Sydnor Harrison
 Laddie by Gene Stratton Porter
 The Judgment House by Gilbert Parker
 Heart of the Hills by John Fox, Jr.
 The Amateur Gentleman by Jeffery Farnol
 The Woman Thou Gavest Me by Hall Caine
 Pollyanna by Eleanor H. Porter
 The Valiants of Virginia by Hallie Erminie Rives
 T. Tembarom by Frances Hodgson BurnettThe Publishers' Weekly Consensus, American Library Annual 1913–1914, pp. 193–94 (1914) (source includes top fifty adult fiction list, which matches top 10 listed herein for 1913, as well as the top 20 adult non-fiction list and top 20 juvenile titles)

1914
 The Eyes of the World by Harold Bell Wright
 Pollyanna by Eleanor H. Porter
 The Inside of the Cup by Winston Churchill
 The Salamander by Owen Johnson
 The Fortunate Youth by William J. Locke
 T. Tembarom by Frances Hodgson Burnett
 Penrod by Booth Tarkington
 Diane of the Green Van by Leona Dalrymple
 The Devil's Garden by W. B. Maxwell
 The Prince of Graustark by George Barr McCutcheon

1915
 The Turmoil by Booth Tarkington
 A Far Country by Winston Churchill
 Michael O'Halloran by Gene Stratton Porter
 Pollyanna Grows Up by Eleanor H. Porter
 K by Mary Roberts Rinehart
 Jaffery by William J. Locke
 Felix O'Day by F. Hopkinson Smith
 The Harbor by Ernest Poole
 The Lone Star Ranger by Zane Grey
 Angela's Business by Henry Sydnor Harrison

1916
 Seventeen by Booth Tarkington
 When a Man's a Man by Harold Bell Wright
 Just David by Eleanor H. Porter
 Mr. Britling Sees It Through by H. G. Wells
 Life and Gabriella by Ellen Glasgow
 The Real Adventure by Henry Kitchell Webster
 Bars of Iron by Ethel M. Dell
 Nan of Music Mountain by Frank H. Spearman
 Dear Enemy by Jean Webster
 The Heart of Rachael by Kathleen Norris

1917
 Mr. Britling Sees It Through by H. G. Wells
 The Light in the Clearing by Irving Bacheller
 The Red Planet by William J. Locke
 The Road to Understanding by Eleanor H. Porter
 Wildfire by Zane Grey
 Christine by Alice Cholmondeley
 In the Wilderness by Robert S. Hichens
 His Family by Ernest Poole
 The Definite Object by Jeffery Farnol
 The Hundredth Chance by Ethel M. Dell

1918
 The U.P. Trail by Zane Grey
 The Tree of Heaven by May Sinclair
 The Amazing Interlude by Mary Roberts Rinehart
 Dere Mable by Edward Streeter
 Oh, Money! Money! by Eleanor H. Porter
 Greatheart by Ethel M. Dell
 The Major by Ralph Connor
 The Pawns Count by E. Phillips Oppenheim
 A Daughter of the Land by Gene Stratton Porter
 Sonia by Stephen McKenna

1919
 The Four Horseman of the Apocalypse by Vicente Blasco Ibáñez
 The Arrow of Gold by Joseph Conrad
 The Desert of Wheat by Zane Grey
 Dangerous Days by Mary Roberts Rinehart
 The Sky Pilot in No Man's Land by Ralph Connor
 The Re-Creation of Brian Kent by Harold Bell Wright
 Dawn by Eleanor H. Porter
 The Tin Soldier by Temple Bailey
 Christopher and Columbus by Elizabeth von Arnim
 In Secret by Robert W. Chambers

References

Bestselling novels in the United States
Novels
1910s books